Procurator (with procuracy or procuratorate referring to the office itself) may refer to:

 Procurator, one engaged in procuration, the action of taking care of, hence management, stewardship, agency
 Procurator (Ancient Rome), the title of various officials of the Roman Empire
 Procurator (Catholic canon law), one who acts on behalf of and by virtue of the authority of another
 Procurator fiscal, the public prosecutor in Scotland
 Procurator of San Marco, the second most prestigious life appointment in the Republic of Venice
 HM Procurator General and Treasury Solicitor, one of the positions held by the Treasury Solicitor in the United Kingdom
 People's procuratorates, part of the judicial system of China
 Supreme People's Procuratorate, China
 Supreme People's Procuracy of Vietnam, an office of the Vietnamese government

See also 
 Procurator General (disambiguation)
 Proctor, a kind of supervisor or representative in England
 Procuracies, three buildings in Venice